The United States Navy patrol vessel USS Halcyon, was built by the Defoe Shipbuilding Company, in Bay City, Michigan, in 1912.  She was taken over by the US Navy from her owner, G. G. Barnum, at Duluth, Minnesota, on 16 June 1917.  After serving briefly on section patrol in the Great Lakes, 9th Naval District, Halcyon was returned to her owner on 5 November 1917.

References

Ships built in Bay City, Michigan
1912 ships